Talara cinerea is a moth in the subfamily Arctiinae. It was described by George Hampson in 1900. It is found in Colombia.

References

Arctiidae genus list at Butterflies and Moths of the World of the Natural History Museum

Moths described in 1900
Lithosiini